Althea Racing is a motorcycle racing team based in Civita Castellana, Italy. For 2019, two versions of the team operate within the World Superbike Championship, as Moriwaki Althea Honda Team having two riders in conjunction with HRC, and as Althea MIE Racing Team with one rider using Honda Fireblade motorcycles.

In 2020, the race season was disrupted by the COVID-19 pandemic after the first round in March hosted in Australia; on resumption in August Jordi Torres was replaced by Lorenzo Gabellini for three rounds until Althea's Italian management split from Moriwaki.

Althea previously competed the defunct European Superstock 1000 Championship, winning in 2016 with rider Raffaele De Rosa.

Race Results

World Supersport Championship

References

External links
Official website

Superbike racing